Alhendín is a city located in the province of Granada, Spain. According to the 2005 census (INE), the city had a population of 5200 inhabitants.

References

Municipalities in the Province of Granada